Con Alma is an album by pianist Ray Bryant  released on Columbia Records in 1961.

Reception 

The Allmusic review stated: "Bryant is typically soulful, swinging and reasonably explorative on nine songs".

Track listing 
 "Con Alma" (Dizzy Gillespie) – 6:55
 "Milestones" (Miles Davis) – 4:10
 "'Round Midnight" (Thelonious Monk, Cootie Williams) – 3:51
 "Django" (John Lewis) – 5:38 Bonus track on CD reissue
 "Nuts and Bolts" (Ray Bryant) – 3:05
 "Cubano Chant" (Bryant) – 4:22
 "Ill Wind" (Harold Arlen, Ted Koehler) – 3:12
 "Autumn Leaves" (Joseph Kosma, Jacques Prévert, Johnny Mercer) – 5:22
 "C Jam Blues" (Duke Ellington) – 4:22
Recorded at Columbia Records, 30th Street Studio, NYC, on November 25, 1960 (tracks 2 & 4), and January 26, 1961 (tracks 1, 3 & 5–9)

Personnel 
Ray Bryant – piano
 Arthur Harper (tracks 2 & 4), Bill Lee (tracks 1, 3, 5 & 7–9) – bass
Mickey Roker – drums (tracks 1–5 & 7–9)

References 

1961 albums
Ray Bryant albums
Columbia Records albums